Sofia Corban (née Banovici, born 1 August 1956) is a retired Romanian rower who competed in the quadruple sculls. She won a gold medal at the 1984 Olympics, placing fourth in 1980, and three bronze medals at the world championships in 1979–1982.

References

External links 
 
 
 

1956 births
Living people
Romanian female rowers
Rowers at the 1980 Summer Olympics
Rowers at the 1984 Summer Olympics
Olympic gold medalists for Romania
Olympic medalists in rowing
World Rowing Championships medalists for Romania
Medalists at the 1984 Summer Olympics